Michael Caine (born 13 August 1969 in Cambridge) is a British auto racing driver. He currently competes in the British GT Championship and the British Touring Car Championship. He was the 2012 British GT champion along with Daniele Perfetti.

Racing career

British Touring Car Championship
He made his British Touring Car Championship debut for Airwaves Racing at Rockingham in 2011, where he competed for two rounds, scoring a point on his debut.

Caine returned to the BTCC for the 2013 season, beginning with the fifth round of the championship at Croft where he would drive a Ford Focus Mk.III ST for Addison Lee Motorbase.
Michael Caine returned to the BTCC with Team HARD in 2016 replacing Chris Smiley. On 3 January 2018, Caine was announced as the 4th driver with Team HARD for the 2018 season of the British Touring Car Championship. On 27 September 2019, it was announced that Caine would be replacing Nicolas Hamilton at Motorbase for the remaining two rounds of the season.

British GT Championship
He has previously competed in series such as the Porsche Carrera Cup Great Britain and British GT Championship. For 2012 he returned to the British GT Championship with Motorbase in a Porsche 911 GT3R.

Caine stayed in the championship for 2013, now paired with Ahmad Al Harthy. Caine remained with Motorbase Performance for the 2014 season, now racing an Aston Martin Vantage GT3 alongside Al Harthy in the British GT Championship and with Al Harthy and Stephen Jelley in the Blancpain Endurance Series.

Racing record

24 Hours of Le Mans results

Britcar 24 Hour results

Complete British Touring Car Championship results
(key) (Races in bold indicate pole position – 1 point awarded in first race) (Races in italics indicate fastest lap – 1 point awarded all races) (* signifies that driver lead race for at least one lap – 1 point awarded all races)

Partial British GT Championship results
(key) (Races in bold indicate pole position) (Races in italics indicate fastest lap)

† As Caine was a guest driver, he was ineligible for points.

References

External links
Michael's official site
BTCC official site
Motorbase Performance

Living people
English racing drivers
1969 births
British Touring Car Championship drivers
British GT Championship drivers
Blancpain Endurance Series drivers
24 Hours of Spa drivers
Porsche Carrera Cup GB drivers
Ginetta GT4 Supercup drivers
JHR Developments drivers